Peøria, previously known as Saving Forever, is an American pop rock band from South Chicago, Illinois made up of brothers Khaden (born 2004), Kye (born 2002) and Kavah Harris (born 2001). The trio released "Twenty 1" followed by the single "Million Ways" in 2017 accompanied by a music video. The sibling band comes from a very musical family. It was picked as Elvis Duran's Artist of the Month and was featured on NBC's Today show hosted by Kathie Lee Gifford and Hoda Kotb and broadcast nationally where they performed live their single "Million Ways".

The band changed their name from Saving Forever to Peøria in June 2020. Their self-titled EP was released on August 7, 2020. The EP was produced by Kye Harris, Christopher Ahn and Laprete.

References

External links
Official website
Facebook
Instagram

Musical groups from Chicago